Sigappu Nirathil Chinnappoo is a 1990 Indian Tamil-language film written and directed by R. Selvaraj, and produced by D. Ramanaidu. The film stars Rattankumar and Rekha. It was released on 22 June 1990.

Plot 

Annachi is a social worker who fights anti-social people, even those of high status. This leads to a mortal attack on him by a criminal named Mahadevan and for six months, Annachi's wife Kasturi tends to her husband who is comatose. Just when Annachi is regaining consciousness, Mahadevan returns to kill him and frames Annachi's wife, leading to her arrest. Annachi's son becomes determined to clear his mother's name. He eventually kills Mahadevan and is sent to a juvenile detention center, while Kasturi is exonerated.

Cast 
 Rattankumar as Annachi
 Rekha as Kasturi
 Victor Ponnudurai as Mahadevan
 Master Suresh as Annachi's son
 Baby Sajini as Annachi's daughter

Production 
Sigappu Nirathil Chinnappoo was produced by D. Ramanaidu under Rajeshwari Films on a budget of 7 lakh, and directed by R. Selvaraj who also wrote the script. Vinod Raj portrayed the antagonist Mahadevan, using the screen name Victor Ponnudurai.

Soundtrack 
The soundtrack was composed by Jaisekar.

Release and reception 
Sigappu Nirathil Chinnappoo was released on 22 June 1990. N. Krishnaswamy of The Indian Express wrote, "Sigappu Nirathil Chinnappoo avoids the beaten track of the masala film."

References

External links 
 

1990s Tamil-language films
Films directed by R. Selvaraj (screenwriter)